Viktor Mikhaylovich Burayev (born 23 August 1982, in Penza) is a male race walker from Russia. On August 5, 2008, Burayev and training partners Sergey Morozov, Aleksey Voyevodin, and Vladimir Kanaykin, all coached by Viktor Chegin, were banned from competition, following a positive EPO test. The positive tests were conducted in April 2008. and evidenced systematic doping.

International competitions

References

sports-reference

1982 births
Living people
Sportspeople from Penza
Russian male racewalkers
Olympic male racewalkers
Olympic athletes of Russia
Athletes (track and field) at the 2004 Summer Olympics
World Athletics Championships athletes for Russia
World Athletics Championships medalists
Russian Athletics Championships winners
Doping cases in athletics
Russian sportspeople in doping cases